The 2012 Northern Illinois Huskies football team represented Northern Illinois University as a member of the West Division of the Mid-American Conference (MAC) during the 2012 NCAA Division I FBS football season. Northern Illinois compiled an overall record of 12–2 with a mark of 8–0 in conference play, winning the MAC West Division title. The Huskies advanced to the MAC Championship Game, where they beat Kent State to win the program's third MAC championship. Northern Illinois was invited to the Orange Bowl, where they lost to Florida State. Second-year head coach Dave Doeren led the team during the regular season and the MAC title game before resigning to become the head footbal coach at North Carolina State University. Rod Carey was appointed interim head coach for the bowl game. The team's 12 wins was the most in any of the program's 113-year history.

Since the MAC was a non-automatic qualifying (non-AQ) conference for the Bowl Championship Series, its conference champion had to finish 16th or higher in the BCS rankings and be ranked ahead of at least one AQ conference champion to qualify for a BCS game. With their win in the MAC Championship Game, the Huskies moved to No. 15 in the final BCS rankings, while Louisville, champion of the Big East Confernece, was ranked No. 21. As a result, Northern Illinois received a BCS bid to the Orange Bowl. It was the first major-bowl appearance in program history and the first major-bowl appearance for any MAC team.

The season marked the Huskies' fifth consecutive trip to a bowl game. The team played home games at Huskie Stadium in DeKalb, Illinois.

Schedule

Rankings

Roster

Game summaries

vs Iowa

UT Martin

@ Army

Kansas

Central Michigan

@ Ball State

Buffalo

@ Akron

@ Western Michigan

Massachusetts

Toledo

@ Eastern Michigan

#18 Kent State (MAC Championship Game)

#12 Florida State (Orange Bowl)

References

Northern Illinois
Northern Illinois Huskies football seasons
Mid-American Conference football champion seasons
Northern Illinois Huskies football